Super Star Wars: Return of the Jedi is an action video game developed by LucasArts and Sculptured Software and published by JVC Musical Industries for the Super Nintendo Entertainment System in North America on June 22, 1994, Europe on March 30, 1995 and in Japan on June 23, 1995. It is based on the 1983 film Return of the Jedi. It was ported to the Game Boy and Game Gear by Realtime Associates, which were published by THQ in 1995. The game was re-released on the Wii Virtual Console in North America on September 7, 2009 and in PAL regions on October 16, 2009, alongside the other games in the Super Star Wars series.

Plot and gameplay
Super Star Wars: Return of the Jedi follows closely the standard set by the previous two Super Star Wars games, with the return of selectable characters (on specific levels), multiple playable characters and Mode 7 quasi-3D vehicle sequences. The controls are identical to the second game, and this installment also includes its predecessor's password save option. It loosely follows the plot of Return of the Jedi, with some added scenes, such as Luke Skywalker having to fight through the Death Star to get to The Emperor. In addition to the standard Luke Skywalker, Han Solo, and Chewbacca, Princess Leia and Wicket appear as playable characters.

Bosses include Jabba the Hutt, the Rancor beast, Darth Vader and The Emperor. Vehicle sequences include the Endor speeder bike chase, and a cruise in the Millennium Falcon. Luke Skywalker no longer has nine Force powers to work with but five and it is easier for him to "recharge" his abilities. He also cannot use any variation of the blaster in this game. Princess Leia is unique in that her appearance and playstyle changes in accordance with the plot. She uses a staff as the bounty hunter Boushh when approaching Jabba's palace, fights with a broken chain as Jabba's escaped slave on his sail barge, and wields a blaster when fighting on Endor as a Rebel leader.

Release
In 1996 THQ announced that they would re-release Super Star Wars: The Empire Strikes Back and Super Star Wars: Return of the Jedi in February 1997 in order to coincide with the "Special Edition" of those films appearing in theaters. The re-release is identical to the original version. The re-release is missing the sticker on the back, opting instead for engraving on the cart itself

Reception
  
On release, Scary Larry of GamePro gave the Super NES version a mostly negative review. Though he praised the musical score, he criticized the game for frustrating controls, overly easy bosses, and particularly the level designs, which he said are repetitious and mostly feel like retreads of level designs from the two previous games in the series. In contrast, Electronic Gaming Monthly gave it an 8 out of 10, praising it for the "excellent" graphics and the need to move carefully through the levels. Famicom Tsūshin scored it a 23 out of 40.

GamePros Coach Kyle found some flaws in the Game Boy version, such as the rudimentary backgrounds, but rated it "one of the year's most fun and challenging handheld games", particularly due to the diverse gameplay offered by the five playable characters. Quick-Draw McGraw gave the Game Gear similar praise in the same magazine, and said the graphics are nearly as good as the SNES version's. Power Unlimited gave the Game Boy version a score of 74% writing: "Quality game with long and difficult levels, although the overview on the small screen is sometimes lost. Also a challenge for the experienced platform player."

Super Return of the Jedi was awarded Best Movie-to-Game of 1994 by Electronic Gaming Monthly. EGM and GamePro both named it Best Game Gear Game of 1995. IGN placed the game as number 26 on their Top 100 SNES Games of All Time.  They praised the  game’s additional gameplay variety playing up to five characters compared to its predecessors. In 2018, Complex listed the game #67 on its "The Best Super Nintendo Games of All Time" saying the game is almost as great but not as difficult compared to its predecessors.

References

External links

1994 video games
Black Pearl Software games
Game Boy games
Game Gear games
LucasArts games
Platform games
Return of the Jedi video games
Run and gun games
Single-player video games
Super Nintendo Entertainment System games
THQ games
Video games based on films
Video games developed in the United States
Virtual Console games